Mohammed Nuru (born November 15, 1962, England) is an American former civil servant. He was formerly the Director of the San Francisco Department of Public Works where he was involved in a corruption scandal.

Personal life 
Nuru was born in the United Kingdom and raised on a farm in Nigeria. In 1983, he immigrated to the United States to study landscape architecture at Kansas State University.

Nuru and San Francisco mayor London Breed dated. Following the corruption scandal, Breed acknowledged having accepted gifts from Nuru during her tenure as Mayor and was fined for the ethics violation.

Career 
In 2011 Nuru became the director of the San Francisco Department of Public Works. During his time as director he worked to improve street sanitation and oversaw drastic changes to the Market Street corridor. Addressing homelessness was a major concern during his time as Director; however Nuru diverted homelessness alleviation funds to his friends.

He was the chairman of the board of directors at the Transbay Joint Powers Authority.

Nuru was arrested by the FBI in January 2020 under charges of "corruption, bribery kickbacks and side deals".

Having previously been "placed on leave and removed from all decision-making since the arrest", Nuru resigned on February 10, 2020, as announced by Mayor Breed."

In June 2021 Nuru was arrested for brandishing a knife at the San Francisco-Marin Food Bank in Dogpatch in a case unconnected to the alleged bribery. Nuru underwent a court ordered psychiatric evaluation and no charges resulted from the arrest.

In January 2021 Nuru pled guilty to one count of fraud in exchange for a plea bargain. In February 2021, developer Florence Kong was convicted of bribing Nuru.

In August 2022, Nuru was sentenced to 84 months (7 years) in federal prison.  Nuru is incarcerated at the United States Penitentiary, Lompoc, California.

References 

American civil servants
American criminals
Living people
1962 births